Blastobasis cineracella is a moth in the family Blastobasidae. It was described by Hans Georg Amsel in 1953. It is found in Morocco.

References

Arctiidae genus list at Butterflies and Moths of the World of the Natural History Museum

Blastobasis
Moths described in 1953